The 1911–12 Bucknell Bison men's basketball team represented Bucknell University during the 1911–12 NCAA men's basketball season. The head coach was C. Fulmer, coaching the Bison in his first season.The Bison's team captain was Herman Zehner.

Schedule

|-

References

Bucknell Bison men's basketball seasons
Bucknell
Bucknell
Bucknell